Héctor Bienvenido "Negro" Trujillo Molina (6 April 1908 – 19 October 2002) was a Dominican general and political figure who was the President of the Dominican Republic between 1952 and 1960. He was the brother of former president and dictator Rafael Trujillo.

Biography
Héctor Trujillo, nicknamed Negro for his facial features and dark complexion, was the youngest brother of Rafael Trujillo. After Trujillo rose to power in 1930, Hector entered the Army and advanced rapidly. He reached the rank of a major general before he was appointed "Secretary of State for War and Navy" in 1942. In 1944, he became "General of the Army', a newly created title. Aside from his military activities, Hector was busy amassing land and money. A philanderer, he became engaged to Alma McLaughlin in 1937, and the marriage eventually took place two decades later. 

Héctor Trujillo worked as a "puppet" for his brother who had all the control; made president on August 16, 1952, he was asked to resign on August 3, 1960, when his brother reshuffled the government.

He died of natural causes in Miami on October 19, 2002. Trujillo was married to Alma McLaughlin Simó. The couple had no children.

References

Rafael Trujillo
Presidents of the Dominican Republic
Dominican Republic people of Canarian descent
Dominican Republic people of French descent
Dominican Republic people of Haitian descent
Dominican Republic people of Spanish descent
People from San Cristóbal, Dominican Republic
1908 births
2002 deaths
Dominican Party politicians
Dominican Republic military personnel
Dominican Republic anti-communists
Grand Crosses Special Class of the Order of Merit of the Federal Republic of Germany
Mixed-race Dominicans